Pavićević is a South Slavic surname, commonly found in Montenegro, Serbia and Croatia. It may refer to:

Biljana Pavićević (basketball) (b. 1980), Montenegrin women's basketball player
Biljana Pavićević (handballer) (b. 1988), Montenegrin women's handball player
Bojan Pavićević (b. 1975), Serbian futsal player
Borka Pavićević (b. 1947), Montenegrin dramaturge and cultural activist
Darko Pavićević (b. 1986), Montenegrin footballer
Ljubomir Pavićević Fis (b. 1927), Serbian graphic and industrial designer
Luka Pavićević (b. 1968), Serbian basketball coach
Marko Pavićević (b. 1986), Serbian footballer
Mila Pavićević (b. 1988), Croatian writer
Savo Pavićević (b. 1980), Montenegrin footballer
Zorica Pavićević (b. 1956), Montenegrin women's handball player

Serbian surnames